Nicholas Coleman or Nick Coleman may refer to:

 Nicholas D. Coleman (Nicholas Daniel Coleman, 1800–1874), U.S. Representative from Kentucky
 Nick Coleman (politician) (Nicholas David Coleman, 1925–1981), American politician from Minnesota
 Nick Coleman (British writer) (born 1960), British writer
 Nick Coleman (columnist) (1950–2018), American journalist in Minnesota